Yaek Kor Por Aor Station is a BTS Skytrain station, on the Sukhumvit Line in Bangkok, Thailand.  The station is part of the northern extension of the Sukhumvit Line and opened on 16 December 2020, as part of phase 4. It can be considered as the last station of Bangkok on the northern Sukhumvit Line.

History 
The station was initially named KM.25 Station as it was located on kilometre 25 of Phahonyothin Road and there were no major landmarks to name the station. However, it was renamed to Yaek Kor Por Aor Station (lit. Kor Por Aor Intersection) to match up with an intersection of a new road built by the MRTA which linked Phahonyothin Road and Lam Lukka Road. "Kor Por Aor" is the Thai abbreviation of the Directorate of Air Operations Control (DOAC) of the Royal Thai Air Force which is located nearby.

See also 
 Bangkok Skytrain

References 

BTS Skytrain stations